A stellar black hole (or stellar-mass black hole) is a black hole formed by the gravitational collapse of a star. They have masses ranging from about 5 to several tens of solar masses. The process is observed as a hypernova explosion or as a gamma ray burst. These black holes are also referred to as collapsars.

Properties
By the no-hair theorem, a black hole can only have three fundamental properties: mass, electric charge, and angular momentum. The angular momentum of a stellar black hole is due to the conservation of angular momentum of the star or objects that produced it.

The gravitational collapse of a star is a natural process that can produce a black hole. It is inevitable at the end of the life of a large star when all stellar energy sources are exhausted. If the mass of the collapsing part of the star is below the Tolman–Oppenheimer–Volkoff (TOV) limit for neutron-degenerate matter, the end product is a compact star – either a white dwarf (for masses below the Chandrasekhar limit) or a neutron star or a (hypothetical) quark star. If the collapsing star has a mass exceeding the TOV limit, the crush will continue until zero volume is achieved and a black hole is formed around that point in space.

The maximum mass that a neutron star can possess (without becoming a black hole) is not fully understood. In 1939, it was estimated at 0.7 solar masses, called the TOV limit. In 1996, a different estimate put this upper mass in a range from 1.5 to 3 solar masses.

In the theory of general relativity, a black hole could exist of any mass. The lower the mass, the higher the density of matter has to be in order to form a black hole. (See, for example, the discussion in Schwarzschild radius, the radius of a black hole.) There are no known processes that can produce black holes with mass less than a few times the mass of the Sun. If black holes that small exist, they are most likely primordial black holes. Until 2016, the largest known stellar black hole was  solar masses. In September 2015, a rotating black hole of  solar masses was discovered by gravitational waves as it formed in a merger event of two smaller black holes. , the binary system 2MASS J05215658+4359220 was reported to host the smallest-mass black hole currently known to science, with a mass 3.3 solar masses and a diameter of only 19.5 kilometers. 

There is observational evidence for two other types of black holes, which are much more massive than stellar black holes. They are intermediate-mass black holes (in the center of globular clusters) and supermassive black holes in the center of the Milky Way and other galaxies.

X-ray compact binary systems

Stellar black holes in close binary systems are observable when the matter is transferred from a companion star to the black hole; the energy released in the fall toward the compact star is so large that the matter heats up to temperatures of several hundred million degrees and radiates in X-rays.  The black hole, therefore, is observable in X-rays, whereas the companion star can be observed with optical telescopes. The energy release for black holes and neutron stars are of the same order of magnitude. Black holes and neutron stars are therefore often difficult to distinguish.

However, neutron stars may have additional properties. They show differential rotation, and can have a magnetic field and exhibit localized explosions (thermonuclear bursts). Whenever such properties are observed, the compact object in the binary system is revealed as a neutron star.

The derived masses come from observations of compact X-ray sources (combining X-ray and optical data). All identified neutron stars have a mass below 3.0 solar masses; none of the compact systems with a mass above 3.0 solar masses display the properties of a neutron star. The combination of these facts makes it more and more likely that the class of compact stars with a mass above 3.0 solar masses are in fact black holes.

Note that this proof of the existence of stellar black holes is not entirely observational but relies on theory: we can think of no other object for these massive compact systems in stellar binaries besides a black hole.  A direct proof of the existence of a black hole would be if one actually observes the orbit of a particle (or a cloud of gas) that falls into the black hole.

Black hole kicks 
The large distances above the galactic plane achieved by some binaries are the result of black hole natal kicks. The velocity distribution of black hole natal kicks seems similar to that of neutron star kick velocities. One might have expected that it would be the momenta that were the same with black holes receiving lower velocity than neutron stars due to their higher mass but that doesn't seem to be the case, which may be due to the fall-back of asymmetrically expelled matter increasing the momentum of the resulting black hole.

Mass gaps 
It is predicted by some models of stellar evolution that black holes with masses in two ranges cannot be directly formed by the gravitational collapse of a star. These are sometimes distinguished as the "lower" and "upper" mass gaps, roughly representing the ranges of 2 to 5 and 50 to 150 solar masses, respectively. Another range given for the upper gap is 52 to 133 .  has been regarded as the upper mass limit for stars in the current era of the universe.

Lower mass gap 
A lower mass gap is suspected on the basis of a scarcity of observed candidates with masses within a few solar masses above the maximum possible neutron star mass. The existence and theoretical basis for this possible gap are uncertain. The situation may be complicated by the fact that any black holes found in this mass range may have been created via the merging of binary neutron star systems, rather than stellar collapse. The LIGO/Virgo collaboration has reported three candidate events among their gravitational wave observations in run O3 with component masses that fall in this lower mass gap. There has also been reported an observation of a bright, rapidly rotating giant star in a binary system with an unseen companion emitting no light, including x-rays, but having a mass of  solar masses. This is interpreted to suggest that there may be many such low-mass black holes that are not currently consuming any material and are hence undetectable via the usual x-ray signature.

Upper mass gap 
The upper mass gap is predicted by comprehensive models of late-stage stellar evolution. It is expected that with increasing mass, supermassive stars reach a stage where a pair-instability supernova occurs, during which pair production, the production of free electrons and positrons in the collision between atomic nuclei and energetic gamma rays, temporarily reduces the internal pressure supporting the star's core against gravitational collapse. This pressure drop leads to a partial collapse, which in turn causes greatly accelerated burning in a runaway thermonuclear explosion, resulting in the star being blown completely apart without leaving a stellar remnant behind.

Pair-instability supernovae can only happen in stars with a mass range from around 130 to 250 solar masses (and low to moderate metallicity (low abundance of elements other than hydrogen and helium – a situation common in Population III stars)). However, this mass gap is expected to be extended down to about 45 solar masses by the process of pair-instability pulsational mass loss, before the occurrence of a "normal" supernova explosion and core collapse. In nonrotating stars the lower bound of the upper mass gap may be as high as 60 . The possibility of direct collapse into black holes of stars with core mass > 133 , requiring total stellar mass of > 260  has been considered, but there may be little chance of observing such a high-mass supernova remnant; i.e., the lower bound of the upper mass gap may represent a mass cutoff. 

Observations of the LB-1 system of a star and unseen companion were initially interpreted in terms of a black hole with a mass of about 70 solar masses, which would be excluded by the upper mass gap.  However, further investigations have weakened this claim.

Black holes may also be found in the mass gap through mechanisms other than those involving a single star, such as the merger of black holes.

Candidates

Our Milky Way galaxy contains several stellar-mass black hole candidates (BHCs) which are closer to us than the supermassive black hole in the galactic center region. Most of these candidates are members of X-ray binary systems in which the compact object draws matter from its partner via an accretion disk. The probable black holes in these pairs range from three to more than a dozen solar masses.

Extragalactic
Candidates outside our galaxy come from gravitational wave detections:

The disappearance of N6946-BH1 following a failed supernova in NGC 6946 may have resulted in the formation of a black hole.

See also
 Black holes in fiction
 Supermassive black hole
 Rogue black hole

References

External links

Black Holes: Gravity's Relentless Pull Award-winning interactive multimedia Web site about the physics and astronomy of black holes from the Space Telescope Science Institute
 Black hole diagrams

Heaviest Stellar Black Hole Discovered in Nearby Galaxy, Newswise, 17-Oct-2007

+
Compact stars